Shi Qing may refer to:

Shi Qing (石清), a fictional character in the novel Ode to Gallantry
Shi Qing (actor), a Chinese actor
Shi Qing (Han Dynasty) (石慶), a Han Dynasty chancellor